Dennis Robert Hoagland (April 2, 1884 – September 5, 1949) was an American chemist and plant and soil scientist working in the fields of plant nutrition, soil chemistry, biochemistry, and physiology. He was Professor of Plant Nutrition at the University of California at Berkeley from 1927 until his death in 1949.

Dennis Hoagland is commonly known for discovering the active transport of electrolytes in plant cells, using innovative model systems under controlled experimental conditions, such as solution culture.

Hoagland was able to show that various plant diseases are caused by a lack of trace elements such as zinc and established their importance for plant nutrition and development.

He pioneered research into the interactions between plant and soil by establishing soil pH and the importance of soil solution, temperature and light for plant growth.

Hoagland and his associates formulated an artificial, complete inorganic nutrient medium, universally known as Hoagland solution, that continues to be used worldwide  for culturing plants hydroponically.

Biography

Private life

Dennis Hoagland was the son of Charles Breckinridge Hoagland (1859 – 1934) and Lillian May Hoagland (1863 – 1951). He spent his first eight years in Golden and during his later childhood he lived in Denver. He attended the Denver public schools and in 1903 entered Stanford University. In 1920, Dennis R. Hoagland married Jessie A. Smiley. She died suddenly of pneumonia in 1933. He was left with the responsibility of bringing up three young boys named Robert Charles, Albert Smiley, and Charles Rightmire.

Career

Hoagland graduated from Stanford University (1907) with a major in chemistry. In 1908 he became an instructor and assistant in the Laboratory of Animal Nutrition at the University of California at Berkeley, an institution with which he would be associated for the remainder of his life. There he worked in the fields of animal nutrition and biochemistry. In 1910 he was appointed assistant chemist in the Food and Drug Administration of the U.S. Department of Agriculture until 1912 (Schmidt and Hoagland, 1912, 1919), when he entered the graduate school in the Department of Agricultural Chemistry with Elmer McCollum at the University of Wisconsin, receiving his master's degree in 1913 (McCollum and Hoagland, 1913). In the fall of that year he became assistant professor of agricultural chemistry and in 1922 associate professor of plant nutrition at Berkeley. He was a founder of the Annual Review of Biochemistry and a proponent of the Annual Review of Plant Physiology and the Annual Review of Medicine which first appeared in 1950, after his death.

Work

Brief overview

During World War I, Hoagland tried to substitute the lack of imports of potassium-based fertilizers from the German Empire to the United States with plant extracts from brown algae, inspired by the ability of giant kelp to absorb elements from seawater selectively and to accumulate potassium and iodide many times in excess of the concentrations found in seawater (Hoagland, 1915). Based on these findings he investigated the ability of plants to absorb salts against a concentration gradient and discovered the dependence of nutrient absorption and translocation on metabolic energy using innovative model systems under controlled experimental conditions (Hoagland, Hibbard, and Davis, 1926).

During his systematic research, mainly by solution culture technique, and inspired by a principle of Julius von Sachs and the work of Wilhelm Knop, he developed the basic formula for the Hoagland solution, whose composition was originally patterned after the displaced soil solution obtained from certain soils of high productivity (Hoagland, 1919)1. His research also led to new discoveries on the need and function of trace elements required by living cells, thus establishing the essentiality of molybdenum for the growth of tomato plants, for example (Arnon and Hoagland, 1940; Hoagland, 1945). Hoagland was able to show that various plant diseases are caused by a lack of trace elements such as zinc (Hoagland, Chandler, and Hibbard, 1931, ff.), and that boron, manganese, zinc, and copper are indispensable for normal plant growth (Hoagland, 1937). 

He took special interest in plant-soil interrelationships addressing, for example, the physiological balance of soil solutions and the pH dependence of plant growth, in order to gain a better understanding on the availability and absorption of nutrients in soils and (artifical) solutions (Hoagland, 1916, 1917, 1920, 1922; Hoagland and Arnon, 1941). Hoagland and his associates, including his research assistant William Z. Hassid, thus contributed to the understanding of fundamental cellular physiological processes in green plants that are driven by sunlight as the ultimate form of energy (Hoagland and Davis, 1929; Hoagland and Steward, 1939, 1940; Hoagland, 1944, 1946).

Hoagland's and Knop's solutions

Dennis Hoagland was the first to develop a new type of solution based on the composition of the soil solution (Hoagland, 1919)1. He also developed the first successful concept for distinguishing between concentration and total amount of nutrients in a solution (Johnston and Hoagland, 1929). The term Hoagland solution was first mentioned by Olof Arrhenius in 1922 with reference to the Hoagland publication of 1919 where he defined an optimum nutrient solution as "the minimum concentration which gave maximum yield and beyond there was no further improvement". The respective solution published by Hoagland in 1920 was applied to investigate plant growth parameters of barley in comparison with Shive's solution. The growth of Alfalfa in a modified Hoagland solution was investigated at various pH values in the 1920s. Around the 1930s Hoagland and his associates investigated diseases of certain plants, and thereby, observed symptoms related to existing soil conditions such as salinity. In this context, Hoagland undertook water culture experiments with the hope of delivering similar symptoms under controlled laboratory conditions. For these experiments the Hoagland solution (0), including macronutrients, iron, and the supplementary solutions A and B (trace elements), was newly developed to investigate certain diseases of the strawberry in California (Hoagland and Snyder, 1933).

Hoagland's research was supported by the plant pathologists H. E. Thomas and W. C. Snyder, and influenced by another pioneer of plant nutrition and hydroculture, William Frederick Gericke.  Gericke's groundbreaking results in applying the principles of water culture to commercial agriculture inspired him to expand his research on the subject finally resulting in the Hoagland solutions (1) and (2) (Hoagland and Arnon, 1938, 1950). The composition and concentration of macronutrients of the Hoagland solutions (0) and (1) can be traced back to Wilhelm Knop's four-salt mixture and the molar ratio to experimental results of Hoagland and his associates (cf. Tables (1) and (2)). Knop's solution, in contrast to Hoagland's solution, was not supplemented with trace elements (micronutrients), with the exception of iron, because the chemicals were not particularly pure in Wilhelm Knop's day. Micronutrients were, without knowing it, already present as impurities in the macronutrient salts. More highly purified chemicals and more sensitive methods for analysing trace concentrations were developed from 1930 and onwards.

Knop's four-salt mixture
Table (1). Knop's four-salt mixture (1865)

Macronutrients
Table (2). Composition and full concentration of macronutrients in Hoagland's solution (0, 1, 2) and in Knop's solution

Hoagland's students included Daniel Israel Arnon who modified the composition of macronutrients of the Hoagland solution (2) (cf. Table 2) and the concentration of micronutrients (B, Mn, Zn, Cu, Mo, and Cl) of the Hoagland solutions (1) and (2) (cf. Table (3)) as a result of joint efforts, and Folke Karl Skoog. In contrast to the Murashige and Skoog medium, neither vitamins nor other organic compounds are provided as additives for the Hoagland solution, but only essential minerals as ingredients. Murashige and Skoog concluded that the promotion of growth of tobacco callus cultured on White's modified medium is due mainly to inorganic rather than organic constituents in aqueous tobacco leaf extracts added.

Micronutrients
Table (3). Composition and full concentration of essential micronutrients in Hoagland's solution (0, 1, 2)

As an additional micronutrient, 9 µM ferric tartrate (C12H12Fe2O18) is added to the Hoagland solution formulations (0, 1, 2), corresponding to a concentration of 18 µmol/L Fe3+. Solution (2) contains ammonium and nitrate salts and may sometimes be preferred to solution (0, 1) (cf. Table 2) because the ammonium ion delays the development of undesirable alkalinity (Hoagland and Arnon, 1938, 1950). However, it is toxic to most crop species and is rarely applied as a sole nitrogen source.

Disputed hypotheses
Hoagland concluded that solutions of radically different concentrations and salt proportions did not affect the yield of a crop to any important extent. More recent studies, however, revealed that differences in growth and yield persisted among the commonly used nutrient solutions with already small differences in concentration. As an example, Hoagland's solution (2) led to increased growth of fig trees in high-tunnel and open-field conditions, respectively. One important central aspect of Hoagland's hypothesis that water culture was rarely superior to soil culture ("Yields are not strikingly different under comparable conditions") is questionable (Hoagland and Arnon, 1938, 1950). For example, water culture led to highest biomass and protein production of hydroponically grown tobacco plants compared to other growth substrates, cultivated in the same environmental conditions and supplied with equal amounts of nutrients.

In contrast to Gericke, Hoagland regarded solution culture primarily as a method for discovering scientific laws, while Gericke emphasized that hydroponics wasn't yet a precise science. The authors' differing views are illustrated by the following quotations: "Its commercial application is justifiable under very limited conditions and only under expert supervision" (Hoagland and Arnon, 1938, 1950, The Water Culture Method for Growing Plants Without Soil); "Indeed, it is obvious that since hydroponics requires a larger expense per unit of area than does agriculture, either yields must be larger, or there must be other compensations, if the method is to succeed commercially. And experience has already shown that it can succeed" (Gericke, 1940, Complete Guide to Soilless Gardening). Not surprisingly, the history of hydroponics has proved Gericke right in his claims about the commercial use of this technique.

Awards and honors

Hoagland became a Fellow of the American Association for the Advancement of Science (AAAS) in 1916 and member of the National Academy of Sciences in 1934. In recognition of his many discoveries, the American Society of Plant Physiologists elected Dennis Hoagland as president in 1932 and awarded him the first Stephen Hales Prize in 1929. In 1940, together with Daniel I. Arnon, he received the AAAS Newcomb Cleveland Prize for the work "Availability of Nutrients with Special Reference to Physiological Aspects". In 1944 he published his Lectures on the Inorganic Nutrition of Plants subtitled  "Prather Lectures at Harvard University" which he was invited in 1942 to give at Harvard University. In 1945 he was elected member of the American Academy of Arts and Sciences.

The Dennis R. Hoagland Award, first presented by the American Society of Plant Biologists in 1985, and Hoagland Hall, which is home to the Atmospheric Science program as well as the Environmental Health and Safety office at the UC Davis, are named in his honor.

Perception

Standard nutrient solutions
Nowadays the most common solutions for plant nutrition and plant tissue cultivation are the formulations from Hoagland and Arnon (1938, 1950), and Murashige and Skoog (1962). The basic formulas of Hoagland and Arnon are being replicated by modern manufacturers to produce liquid concentrated fertilizers for plant breeders, farmers, and average consumers. Even the names of Hoagland, Knop, Murashige and Skoog are used as a brand for innovative products, e.g., Hoagland's No. 2 Basal Salt Mixture or Murashige and Skoog Basal Salt Mixture, which are commonly used as standard chemicals in plant science. The Hoagland and Knop medium was specially formulated for plant cell, tissue and organ cultures on sterile agar. 

Hoagland and many other plant nutritionists used over 150 different nutrient solution recipes during their careers (cf. Table (4). In fact, several nutrient recipes refer to a standard name although they have little to do with the original formula. For example, as described by Hewitt, several recipes have been published under the name of "Hoagland", and to this day confusion may arise from a loss of memory about the original composition.

Hewitt's Table 30A
Table (4). Composition of selected standard nutrient solutions modified according to Hewitt (Table 30A). Full concentration of the (essential) elements as ppm.

Hybrid nutrient solutions
Table (5)).

Nagel's Table S4
Table (5). Composition of a hybrid nutrient solution modified according to Nagel et al. (Table S4). Full elemental concentration in ppm.

Hoagland's legacy
Dennis Hoagland was considered a leading authority in his field of research and his lingering research merit was to initiate and to establish the solution named after him, thereby, creating the basis for a balanced plant nutrition that is still valid today.  The Hoagland solution is not only used on earth, but has also proven itself in plant production experiments on the International Space Station. The findings of Hoagland and his associates are relevant to the sustainable use of natural resources such as soil, water and air, water and nutrient use efficiency in crop production and the production of healthy plant foods. Hoagland's fundamental scientific contributions and widely cited publications are of historical relevance to research in modern plant physiology and soil chemistry, which is reflected in the following bibliography.

Bibliography

The Determination of Aluminum in Feces. With C. L. A. Schmidt. J. Biol.
Chem., 11(4) :387-391.

Studies of the Endogenous Metabolism of the Pig as Modified by Various
Factors. (I.-III.). With E. V. McCollum. J. Biol. Chem., 16(3) :299-315, 317-320, 321-325.

The Destructive Distillation of Pacific Coast Kelps. J. Ind. Eng. Chem.,
7(8) :673-676.

Organic Constituents of Pacific Coast Kelps. J. Agr. Res., 4(1) :39-58.

The Complex Carbohydrates and Forms of Sulphur in Marine Algae
of the Pacific Coast. With L. L. Lieb. J. Biol. Chem., 23(1) :287-297.

Acidity and Adsorption in Soils as Measured by the Hydrogen Electrode.
With L. T. Sharp. J. Agr. Res., 7 :123-145.

The Effect of Hydrogen and Hydroxyl Ion Concentration on the Growth
of Barley Seedlings. Soil Sci., 3(6) :547-560.

Relation of Carbon Dioxide to Soil Reaction as Measured by the Hydrogen
Electrode. With L. T. Sharp. J. Agr. Res., 12(3) :139-148.

The Freezing-Point Method as an Index of Variations in the Soil Solution
Due to Season and Crop Growth. J. Agr. Res., 12(6) :369-395.

The Chemical Effects of CaO and CaCO3 on the Soil. Part I. The Effect
on Soil Reaction. With A. W. Christie. Soil Sci., 5(5) :379-382.

The Relation of the Plant to the Reaction of the Nutrient Solution. Science,
48(1243) :422-425.

Notes on Recent Work Concerning Acid Soils. With L. T. Sharp. Soil Sci.
7(3) :197-200.

Note on the Technique of Solution Culture Experiments with Plants.
Science, 49(1267) :360-362.

The Effect of Certain Aluminum Compounds on the Metabolism of
Man. With C. L. A. Schmidt. Univ. Calif. Pub. Path., 2(20) :215-244.

Table of pH, H+, and OH− Values; Corresponding to Electromotive
Forces Determined in Hydrogen Electrode Measurements, with a
Bibliography. With C. L. A. Schmidt. Univ. Calif. Pub. Phys., 5(4):
23-69.

Relation of Nutrient Solution to Composition and Reaction of Cell Sap
of Barley. Bot. Gaz., 68(4) :297-304.

Relation of the Concentration and Reaction of the Nutrient Medium
to the Growth and Absorption of the Plant. J. Agr. Res., 18(2) :73-117.1

The Effect of Several Types of Irrigation Water on the pH Value and
Freezing Point Depression of Various Types of Soils. With A. W.
Christie. Univ. Calif. Pub. Agr. Sci., 4(6) :141-158.

Optimum Nutrient Solutions for Plants. Science, 52(1354) :562-564.

Effect of Season and Crop Growth on the Physical State of the Soil.
With J. C. Martin. J. Agr. Res., 20(5) :396-4O3.

Relation of the Soil Solution to the Soil Extract. With J. C. Martin and
G. R. Stewart. J. Agr. Res., 20(5) :381-395.

The Soil Solution in Relation to the Plant. Trans. Far. Soc., 17(2) :249-254.

Soil Analysis and Soil and Plant Interrelations. Calif. Agr. Exp. Sta.
Cir., 235 :1-8.

Soil Analysis and Soil and Plant Interrelations. Citrus Leaves, 2(6) :1-2,
16-17.

The Feeding Power of Plants. With A. R. Davis and C. B. Lipman.
Science, 57(1471) :299-301.

The Composition of the Cell Sap of the Plant in Relation to the Absorption
of Ions. With A. R. Davis. J. Gen. Phys., 5(5) :629-646.

Effect of Salt on the Intake of Inorganic Elements and on the Buffer
System of the Plant. With J. C. Martin. Calif. Agr. Exp. Sta. Tech. P.,
8 :1-26.

Further Experiments on the Absorption of Ions by Plants, Including
Observations on the Effect of Light. With A. R. Davis. J. Gen. Phys.,
6(1) :47-62.

The Absorption of Ions by Plants. Soil Sci., 16(4) :225-246.

A Comparison of Sand and Solution Cultures with Soils as Media for
Plant Growth. With J. C. Martin. Soil Sci., 16(5) :367-388.

The Effect of the Plant on the Reaction of the Culture Solution. Calif.
Agr. Exp. Sta. Tech. P., 12 :1-16.

The Electrical Charge on a Clay Colloid as Influenced by Hydrogen-Ion
Concentration and by Different Salts. With W. C. Dayhuff. Soil Sci.,
18(5) :401-408.

Suggestions Concerning the Absorption of Ions by Plants. With A. R.
Davis. The New Phytologist, 24(2) :99-111.

Physiological Aspects of Soil Solution Investigations. Calif. Agr. Exp.
Sta. Hilg., 1(11) :227-257.

Some Phases of the Inorganic Nutrition of Plants in Relation to the
Soil Solution: 1. The Growth of Plants in Artificial Culture Media.
Sci. Agr., 6(5) :141-151.

Some Phases of the Inorganic Nutrition of Plants in Relation to the
Soil Solution: 2. Soil Solutions as Media for Plant Growth.
Sci. Agr., 6(6) :177-189.

Effect of Certain Alkali Salts on Growth of Plants. With J. S. Burd and
A. R. Davis. (20) Abstract. Nature and Promise of Soil Solution.
(21) Abstract of Papers Read Before Pan-Pacific Scientific Congress,
Australia.

The Influence of Light, Temperature, and Other Conditions on the Ability
of Nitella Cells to Concentrate Halogens in the Cell Sap. With P. L.
Hibbard and A. R. Davis. J. Gen. Phys., 10(1) :121-146.

The Investigation of the Soil from the Point of View of the Physiology
of the Plant. 4th Int. Conf. Soil Sci. Rome, 1924, 3 :535-544.

The Synthesis of Vitamin E by Plants Grown in Culture Solutions. With
H. M. Evans. Am. J. Phys., 80(3) :702-704.

Recent Experiments Concerning the Adequacy of Artificial Culture Solutions
and of Soil Solutions for the Growth of Different Types of Plants.
With J. C. Martin. Proceedings and Papers of the First Int. Cong. Soil
Sci., 3 :1-12.

Resume of Recent Soil Investigations at the University of California. Mo.
Bull. Calif. Dept. Agr., 16(11) :562-568.

First International Congress of Soil Science, Fourth Commission, Soil
Fertility. (Summary.) Soil Sci., 25(1) :45-50.

The Influence of One Ion on the Accumulation of Another by Plant Cells with
Special Reference to Experiments with Nitella. With A. R. Davis
and P. L. Hibbard. Plant Phys., 3(4) :473-486.

An Apparatus for the Growth of Plants in Controlled Environment. With
A. R. Davis. Plant Phys., 3(3) :277-292.

Minimum Potassium Level Required by Tomato Plants Grown in Water
Cultures. With E. S. Johnston. Soil Sci., 27(2) :89-109.

The Intake and Accumulation of Electrolytes by Plant Cells. With A. R.
Davis. Protoplasma, 6(4) :610-626.

Fertilizer Problems and Analysis of Soils in California. Calif. Agr. Exp.
Sta. Cir., 317 :1-16.

Accumulation of Mineral Elements by Plant Cells. Contrib. Marine Biol.,
pp.  131–144.

Recent Advances in Plant Physiology. Ecology, 11(4) :785-786.

Little-Leaf or Rosette in Fruit Trees, I. With W. H. Chandler and P. L.
Hibbard. Proc. Am. Soc. Hort. Sci., 28 :556-560.

Absorption of Mineral Elements by Plants in Relation to Soil Problems.
Plant Phys., 6(3) :373-388.

Little-Leaf or Rosette of Fruit Trees, II: Effect of Zinc and Other Treatments.
With W. H. Chandler and P. L. Hibbard. Proc. Am. Soc. Hort.
Sci., 29 :255-263.

Mineral Nutrition of Plants. Annu. Rev. Biochem., 1 :618-636.

Some Effects of Deficiencies of Phosphate and Potassium on the Growth
and Composition of Fruit Trees under Controlled Conditions. With
W. H. Chandler. Proc. Am. Soc. Hort. Sci., 29 :267-271.

Little-Leaf or Rosette of Fruit Trees, III. With W. H. Chandler and
P. L. Hibbard. Proc. Am. Soc. Hort. Sci., 30 :70-86.

Mineral Nutrition of Plants. Annu. Rev. Biochem., 2 :471-484.

Nutrition of Strawberry Plant under Controlled Conditions. (a) Effects 
of Deficiencies of Boron and Certain Other Elements, (b) Susceptibility
to Injury from Sodium Salts. With W. C. Snyder. Proc. Am. Soc. Hort. Sci.,
30 :288–294.

Absorption of Potassium by Plants in Relation to Replaceable, Non-Replaceable, and Soil Solution Potassium. With J. C. Martin. Soil
Sci., 36 :1-33.

Methods for Determining Availability of Potassium with Special Reference
to Semi-Arid Soils. Trans. 2nd Commission and Alkali Subcommission
of the International Soc. Soil Sci. Kjobenhavn (Danmark).
Vol. A, pp.  25–31.

Little-Leaf or Rosette of Fruit Trees, IV. With W. H. Chandler and P. L.
Hibbard. Proc. Am. Soc. Hort. Sci., 32 :11-19.

The Potassium Nutrition of Barley with Special Reference to California
Soils. Proc. Fifth Pacific Science Congress, pp.  2669–2676.

Little-Leaf or Rosette of Fruit Trees, V: Effect of Zinc on the Growth
of Plants of Various Types in Controlled Soil and Water Culture
Experiments. With W. H. Chandler and P. L. Hibbard. Proc. Am.
Soc. Hort. Sci., 33 :131-141.

Comments on the Article by A Kozlowski on "Little Leaf or Rosette of
Fruit Trees in California". With W. H. Chandler. Phytopathology, 25(5) :522-522

Absorption of Potassium by Plants and Fixation by the Soil in Relation
to Certain Methods for Estimating Available Nutrients. With J. C.
Martin. Trans. Third Inter. Cong. Soil Sci., 1 :99-103.

Little-Leaf or Rosette of Fruit Trees, VI: Further Experiments Bearing
on the Cause of the Disease. With W. H. Chandler and P. R. Stout.
Proc. Am. Soc. Hort. Sci., 34 :210-212.

The Plant as a Metabolic Unit in the Soil-Plant System. Essays in
Geobotany in Honor of Wm. A. Setchell. Univ. Calif. Press, pp.
219–245.

General Nature of the Process of Salt Accumulation by Roots with
Description of Experimental Methods. With T. C. Broyer. Plant Phys.,
11(3) :471-507.

Some Aspects of the Salt Nutrition of Higher Plants. Bot. Rev., 3 :307-334.

The Water-Culture Method for Growing Plants without Soil. With
D. I. Arnon. Calif. Agr. Exp. Sta. Cir., 347, pp.  1-39.*

Fertilizer Problems and Analysis of Soils in California. Calif. Agr. Exp.
Sta. Cir., 317 :1-16 (Revision).

A Comparison of Water Culture and Soil as Media for Crop Production.
With D. I. Arnon. Science, 89 :512-514.

Upward and Lateral Movement of Salt in Certain Plants as Indicated by
Radioactive Isotopes of Potassium, Sodium, and Phosphorus Absorbed
by Roots. With P. R. Stout. Am. J. Bot., 26(5) :320-324.

Metabolism and Salt Absorption by Plants. With F. C. Steward. Nature,
143 :1031-1032.

Salt Absorption by Plants. With F. C. Steward. Nature, 145 :116-117.

Hydrogen-Ion Effects and the Accumulation of Salt by Barley Roots as
Influenced by Metabolism. With T. C. Broyer. Am. J. Bot., 27 :173-185.

Upward Movement of Salt in the Plant. With T. C. Broyer and P. R. Stout.
Nature, 146 :340-340.

Minute Amounts of Chemical Elements in Relation to Plant Growth.
Science, 91 :557-560.

Methods of Sap Expression from Plant Tissues with Special Reference to
Studies on Salt Accumulation by Excised Barley Roots. With T. C.
Broyer. Am. J. Bot., 27(7) :501-511.

Crop Production in Artificial Culture Solutions and in Soils with Special
Reference to Factors Influencing Yields and Absorption of Inorganic
Nutrients. With D. I. Arnon. Soil Sci., 50(1) :463-485.

Salt Accumulation by Plant Cells with Special Reference to Metabolism
and Experiments on Barley Roots. Cold Spring Harbor Symposia on
Quantitative Biology, Vol. 8.

Some Modern Advances in the Study of Plant Nutrition. Proc. Am. Soc.
Sugar Beet Tech., Part 1 :18-26.

Water Culture Experiments on Molybdenum and Copper Deficiencies of
Fruit Trees. Proc. Am. Soc. Hort. Sci., 38 :8-12.

Physiological Aspects of Availability of Nutrients for Plant Growth.
With D. I. Arnon. Soil Sci., 51(1) :431-444.

Aspects of Progress in the Study of Plant Nutrition. Trop. Agr., 18 :247.

Accumulation of Salt and Permeability in Plant Cells. With T. C. Broyer.
J. Gen. Physiol., 25(6) :865-880.

Metabolic Activities of Roots and Their Bearing on the Relation of
Upward Movement of Salts and Water in Plants. With T. C. Broyer.
Am. J. Bot., 30(4) :261-273.

Composition of the Tomato Plant as Influenced by Nutrient Supply, in
Relation to Fruiting. With D. I. Arnon. Bot. Gaz., 104(4) :576-590.

General Aspects of the Study of Plant Nutrition. Sci. Univ. Calif., pp.
279–294.

The Investigation of Plant Nutrition by Artificial Culture Methods.
With D. I. Arnon. Biol. Rev. Cambr. Phil. Soc., 19(2) :55-67.

Lectures on the Inorganic Nutrition of Plants. (Prather Lectures at Harvard
University). Published by Chronica Botanica Co. Waltham, Mass.

Molybdenum in Relation to Plant Growth. Soil Sci., 60(2) :119-123.

Potassium Fixation in Soils in Replaceable and Non-Replaceable Forms
in Relation to Chemical Reactions in the Soil. With J. C. Martin and
R. Overstreet. Soil Sci. Soc. Am. Proc., 10 :94-101.

The Nutrition and Biochemistry of Plants, Currents in Biochemical
Research. Interscience Publ. Inc. N. Y., pp.  61–77.

Little-Leaf or Rosette of Fruit Trees, VIII: Zinc and Copper Deficiency
in Corral Soils. With W. H. Chandler and J. C. Martin. Proc. Am. Soc.
Hort. Sci., 47 :15-19.

Trace Elements in Plants and Animals by Walter Stiles. Rev. Arch.
Biochem., 13 :311-312.

Fertilizers, Soil Analysis, and Plant Nutrition. Calif. Agr. Exp. Sta. Cir.,
367 :1-24.

Minute Amounts of "Minor" Elements Essential in Addition to "Regular"
Fertilizer. Agr. Chem.

Some Problems of Plant Nutrition. With D. I. Arnon. Sci. Mo., 67(3) :201-209.

Fertilizers, Soil Analysis, and Plant Nutrition. Calif. Agr. Exp. Sta. Cir.,
367 :1-24 (Revision).

Absorption and Utilization of Inorganic Substances in Plants. With
P. R. Stout. Chap. VIII of Agricultural Chemistry, ed. by Frear, Van
Nostrand.

The Water-Culture Method for Growing Plants without Soil. With D. I. Arnon.
Calif. Agr. Exp. Sta. Cir., 347, pp.  1-32 (Revision).**

Availability of Potassium to Crops in Relation to Replaceable and Non-Replaceable Potassium and to Effects of Cropping and Organic Matter.
With J. C. Martin. Soil Sci. Soc. Am. Proc., 15 :272-278.

Courtesy of The National Academy of Sciences Archives, and without these entries it would not have been possible.

References

1884 births
1949 deaths
American nutritionists
University of California, Berkeley College of Natural Resources faculty
Stanford University alumni
Plant physiologists
People from Golden, Colorado
Members of the United States National Academy of Sciences